Wattenberg is a municipality in the district of Innsbruck-Land in the Austrian state of Tyrol located 15 km east of Innsbruck and 2.50 km above the Swarovski crystal town Wattens.

Population

Gallery

References

External links

 Municipality Wattenberg: Official website of the municipality in the Hall-Wattens region

Cities and towns in Innsbruck-Land District